is a Japanese football player currently playing for Nagano Parceiro.

Club statistics
Updated to 23 February 2017.

References

External links
Profile at Nagano Parceiro 
Profile at Consadole Sapporo 

1988 births
Living people
Association football people from Gunma Prefecture
Japanese footballers
J1 League players
J2 League players
J3 League players
Hokkaido Consadole Sapporo players
Matsumoto Yamaga FC players
Kyoto Sanga FC players
AC Nagano Parceiro players
Association football midfielders